Val-de-Sos is a commune in the Ariège department in southern France. The municipality was established on 1 January 2019 by merger of the former communes of Vicdessos (the seat), Sem, Goulier and Suc-et-Sentenac.

See also
Communes of the Ariège department

References

Communes of Ariège (department)

Communes nouvelles of Ariège
Populated places established in 2019
2019 establishments in France